The 2002 Swedish Golf Tour, titled as the 2002 Telia Tour for sponsorship reasons, was the 19th season of the Swedish Golf Tour.

Most tournaments also featured on the 2002 Nordic Golf League.

Sweden's oldest golf club, Göteborg Golf Club, hosted its first SGT event in 2002, in conjunction with its centennial celebration. The total purse for the season was SEK 4,725,000.

Schedule
The following table lists official events during the 2002 season.

Order of Merit
The Order of Merit was based on prize money won during the season, calculated using a points-based system.

See also
2002 Finnish Tour
2002 Swedish Golf Tour (women)

Notes

References

Swedish Golf Tour
Swedish Golf Tour